Marcel-Claude Roy (11 September 1936 – 31 May 2018) was a Liberal party member of the House of Commons of Canada. Born in Laval-des-Rapides, Quebec, Roy was an agrologist by career.

He entered national politics at the Quebec riding of Laval in the 1968 federal election. He was re-elected at Laval (subsequently Laval West) in the 1972, 1974, 1979 and 1980 federal elections but was defeated by Guy Ricard of the Progressive Conservative party. Roy served five successive terms from the 28th to the 32nd Canadian Parliaments.

External links

References

1936 births
2018 deaths
French Quebecers
Members of the House of Commons of Canada from Quebec
Liberal Party of Canada MPs